The Dundy County Courthouse, located at W. 7th Ave. and Chief St. in Benkelman, Nebraska, was built in 1921.

It is significant for association with government and for its architecture.  Relative to other Nebraska "county citadel"-type courthouses, it has an unusual degree of geometric ornamentation.

It was designed by architect A.T. Simmons of Bloomington, Illinois, who had previously designed the Chase County Courthouse in adjacent Chase County, Nebraska.

It was listed on the National Register of Historic Places in 1990.

References

External links 
More photos of the Dundy County Courthouse at Wikimedia Commons

Courthouses on the National Register of Historic Places in Nebraska
Government buildings completed in 1921
Buildings and structures in Dundy County, Nebraska
County courthouses in Nebraska
Historic districts on the National Register of Historic Places in Nebraska
National Register of Historic Places in Dundy County, Nebraska